Neha Dixit is an Indian freelance journalist, covering politics, gender and social justice. She is a visiting faculty at Ashoka University and has been awarded with the Chameli Devi Jain Award (2016) as well as CPJ International Press Freedom Award (2019).

Early life
Dixit attended school in Lucknow, and graduated in English Literature from Miranda House, University of Delhi. Thereafter, she pursued a Masters in Convergent Journalism from the AJK Mass Communication Research Centre, Jamia Milia Islamia in New Delhi.

Career
Dixit began her career as an investigative journalist with Tehelka, before switching to the Special Investigation Team of India Today. Since 2013, she has been a freelancer. Her works have been published in The Wire, Al Jazeera, Outlook, The New York Times, The Caravan, Himal Southasian, and The Washington Post among others.

Notable reports and awards 
In August 2014, Dixit detailed the circumstances faced by seven rape survivors of the 2013 Muzaffarnagar riots. This won her the 2014 Kurt Schork Award in International Journalism and the 2015 Press Institute of India-Red Cross award.

In 2016, Dixit chronicled (for Outlook) the abduction of 31 girls from Assam by a Hindu nationalist organization to infuse them with "nationalist ideologies" — a criminal defamation suit was subsequently filed against Dixit, in what was condemned by Committee to Protect Journalists as a tool of intimidation. The same year, she was conferred with the Chameli Devi Jain Award, the highest honor for women journalists in India: her meticulous nature of coverage and cross-checking of involved facts were admired in particular.

In 2018, she reported on poor Indians, who were unethically drawn into participating in illegal drug-trials by pharma giants. In 2019, Dixit documented a range of extrajudicial killings by police forces in Uttar Pradesh and other states, getting threats from high ranked police officials, in the process. Her reports prompted a note of concern by Office of the United Nations High Commissioner for Human Rights. The same year, she received the CPJ International Press Freedom Award.

Books
In 2016, Dixit was one of the first Indian journalists to use a graphic format for reportage. She contributed a story "The Girl Not from Madras" to the comic book anthology 'First Hand: Graphic Non-fiction from India', about exploitation of women in India. Dixit contributed a chapter on Sexual violence during sectarian violence in India to Breaching the Citadel, an anthology of sexual violence in South Asia 2016 by Zubaan Books.

Personal life 
Dixit is married to Nakul Singh Sawhney, an Indian documentary filmmaker.

Dixit has been charged with "inciting hatred" by the Government of India, a move that has been criticized by the Committee to Protect Journalists. Because of her reporting, she has been subjected to threatening calls and an attempt to break into her house.

References

External links

Year of birth missing (living people)
Living people
Indian women journalists
Delhi University alumni
Indian investigative journalists
Writers from Lucknow
Journalists from Uttar Pradesh
Women writers from Uttar Pradesh
Jamia Millia Islamia alumni
Indian feminists
Indian newspaper journalists
21st-century Indian journalists
Indian women editors
21st-century Indian women writers
21st-century Indian writers
Indian feminist writers
Asian feminists